The Roman Catholic Archdiocese of Toliara is one of five Metropolitan archdioceses with an Ecclesiastical province in Madagascar, yet depends on the missionary Roman Congregation for the Evangelization of Peoples.

It cathedral archiepiscopal see is in Toliara (formerly Tuléar).

Ecclesiastical province 
Its Suffragan sees are :
 Roman Catholic Diocese of Morombe
 Roman Catholic Diocese of Morondava
 Roman Catholic Diocese of Tôlagnaro

Statistics 
As per 2014, it pastorally served 119,638 Catholics (11.8% of 1,014,000 total) on 43,570 km2 in 23 parishes and 1 mission with 63 priests (26 diocesan, 37 religious), 373 lay religious (68 brothers, 305 sisters) and 18 seminarians.

History 
 Established on 1957.04.08 as Diocese of Tuléar, on territty split off from the Diocese of Fort-Dauphin
 Renamed on 1989.10.28 like its see as Diocese of Toliara
 Promoted on 2003.12.03 as Metropolitan Archdiocese of Toliara

Bishops

Ordinaries
(all Roman rite)

Suffragan Bishops of Tuléar  
 Michel-Henri Canonne, Assumptionists (A.A.) (born France) (1959.04.25 – retired 1974.02.28), died 1991
 René Joseph Rakotondrabé (1974.02.28 – 1989.05.15), previously Titular Bishop of Umbriatico (1972.03.25 – 1974.02.28) as Auxiliary Bishop of Tuléar (1972.03.25 – 1974.02.28); later Bishop of Tamatave (Madagascar) (1989.05.15 – 1990.01.31), Bishop of Toamasina (Madagascar) (1990.01.31 – retired 2008.11.24), died 2012

Suffragan Bishops of Toliara 
 Fulgence Rabeony, Jesuits (S.J.) (1990.04.02 – 2003.11.14 see below)

Metropolitan Archbishops of Toliara 
 Fulgence Rabeony, S.J. (see above 2003.12.03 - ...), also President of Episcopal Conference of Madagascar (2002 – 2006)

Auxiliary Bishop
René Joseph Rakotondrabé (1972-1974), appointed Bishop here

See also 
 List of Roman Catholic dioceses in Madagascar

Sources and external links 
 GCatholic.org, with Google satellite photo

Roman Catholic dioceses in Madagascar
Christian organizations established in 1957
Roman Catholic dioceses and prelatures established in the 20th century
A